Socialism and Democracy is a triannual peer-reviewed academic journal established in 1985. It is published by Routledge and the editor-in-chief is Suren Moodliar. The journal is broadly Marxist and writes from a socialist perspective on many topics. In the Norwegian Scientific Index, the journal has been listed as "Level 0" since 2014, which indicates the journal is non-academic and publications in the journal do not count for public research funding.

References

External links

Quarterly journals
Publications established in 1985
English-language journals
Marxist journals
Routledge academic journals